Weston Park is a country house in Staffordshire, England.

Weston Park may refer to:

 Weston Park, Sheffield – a park in Sheffield, England
 Weston Park, Canberra – a park in Australia

Weston Hall 
 Weston Hall, Northamptonshire, England
 Weston Hall, Suffolk, England

See also
 Western Park (disambiguation)